The Virgo Consortium was founded in 1994 for Cosmological Supercomputer Simulations in response to the UK's High Performance Computing Initiative. Virgo developed rapidly into an international collaboration between a dozen scientists in the UK, Germany, Netherlands, Canada, United States and Japan.

Nodes

The largest nodes are the Institute for Computational Cosmology in the UK and the Max Planck Institute for Astrophysics in Germany. Other nodes exist in the UK, Netherlands, Canada, USA and Japan.

Science Goals

The science goals are to carry out state-of-the-art cosmological simulations with  research areas in:

 The large-scale distribution of dark matter
 The formation of dark matter halos
 The formation and evolution of galaxies and clusters
 The physics of the intergalactic medium
 The properties of the intracluster gas

Projects

 The Millennium Simulation
 Galaxy Simulations
 First Objects
 Dark Matter Halos
 Intergalactic Medium
 Semi-Analytical Galaxy Formation
 Hubble Volume
 Mock Catalogues
 GIF Project
 Evolution and Assembly of GaLaxies and their Environments (EAGLE)

The Millennium Simulation

This N-body simulation used more than 10 billion particles to trace the evolution of the matter distribution in a cubic region of the Universe over 2 billion light-years on a side. The first results that were published in 2005 in an issue of Nature, shows how comparing such simulated data to large observational surveys can improve the understanding of the physical processes underlying the buildup of real galaxies and black holes.

Member Countries & Institutes

 : University of Cambridge, University of Durham, University of Edinburgh, University of Nottingham and the University of Sussex
 : Max Planck Institute for Astrophysics
 : Leiden University
 : McMaster University and Queen's University
 : Carnegie Mellon University

References

External links
 Official Site

Physical cosmology
Technology consortia